In geometry, the order-4 pentagonal tiling is a regular tiling of the hyperbolic plane. It has Schläfli symbol of {5,4}. It can also be called a pentapentagonal tiling in a bicolored quasiregular form.

Symmetry 
This tiling represents a hyperbolic kaleidoscope of 5 mirrors meeting as edges of a regular pentagon. This symmetry by orbifold notation is called *22222 with 5 order-2 mirror intersections. In Coxeter notation can be represented as [5*,4], removing two of three mirrors (passing through the pentagon center) in the [5,4] symmetry.

The kaleidoscopic domains can be seen as bicolored pentagons, representing mirror images of the fundamental domain. This coloring represents the uniform tiling t1{5,5} and as a quasiregular tiling is called a pentapentagonal tiling.

Related polyhedra and tiling 

This tiling is topologically related as a part of sequence of regular polyhedra and tilings with pentagonal faces, starting with the dodecahedron, with Schläfli symbol {5,n}, and Coxeter diagram , progressing to infinity.

This tiling is also topologically related as a part of sequence of regular polyhedra and tilings with four faces per vertex, starting with the octahedron, with Schläfli symbol {n,4}, and Coxeter diagram , with n progressing to infinity.

This tiling is topologically related as a part of sequence of regular polyhedra and tilings with vertex figure (4n).

References
 John H. Conway, Heidi Burgiel, Chaim Goodman-Strass, The Symmetries of Things 2008,  (Chapter 19, The Hyperbolic Archimedean Tessellations)
 , invited lecture, ICM, Amsterdam, 1954.

See also

Square tiling
Tilings of regular polygons
List of uniform planar tilings
List of regular polytopes

External links 

 Hyperbolic and Spherical Tiling Gallery
 KaleidoTile 3: Educational software to create spherical, planar and hyperbolic tilings
 Hyperbolic Planar Tessellations, Don Hatch

Hyperbolic tilings
Isogonal tilings
Isohedral tilings
Order-4 tilings
Pentagonal tilings
Regular tilings